Solnechnoye is a rural locality (a selo) and the administrative center of Priozerny Selsoviet of Ivanovsky District, Amur Oblast, Russia. The population was 412 as of 2018. There are 12 streets.

Geography 
Solnechnoye is located 36 km north of Ivanovka (the district's administrative centre) by road. Srednebelaya is the nearest rural locality.

References 

Rural localities in Ivanovsky District, Amur Oblast